Sunshade may refer to:

Brise soleil, architectural sunshades
Shade (shadow), the blocking of sunlight by any object
Space sunshade, a device for blocking a star's rays in space
Umbrella, a device for blocking sunlight or rain
Windshield sun shades, used to block sunlight in a car